The descriptive term rufous-fronted is part of the common name of a number of different bird species:

Rufous-fronted antthrush (Formicarius rufifrons), a species of bird in the family Formicariidae
Rufous-fronted babbler (Stachyridopsis rufifrons), a species of bird in the Old World babbler family
Rufous-fronted laughingthrush (Garrulax rufifrons), a species of bird in the family Timaliidae
Rufous-fronted parakeet (Bolborhynchus ferrugineifrons), a species of parrot in the family Psittacidae
Rufous-fronted prinia (Prinia buchanani), a species of bird in the family Cisticolidae
Rufous-fronted tailorbird (Orthotomus frontalis), a species of Old World warbler in the family Sylviidae
Rufous-fronted thornbird (Phacellodomus rufifrons), a species of bird in the family Furnariidae
Rufous-fronted tit (Aegithalos iouschistos), a small passerine bird of the eastern and central Himalayas belonging to the long-tailed tit family, Aegithalidae
Rufous-fronted wood quail (Odontophorus erythrops), a species of bird in the family Odontophoridae